Sven Köhler (born 8 November 1996) is a German professional footballer who plays as a midfielder for VfL Osnabrück.

Career
Köhler made his professional debut for VfL Osnabrück in the 2. Bundesliga on 2 August 2019, coming on as a substitute in the 90+4th minute for Anas Ouahim in the 1–0 away win against SV Sandhausen.

References

External links
 
 
 Profile at kicker.de

1996 births
Living people
People from Warstein
Sportspeople from Arnsberg (region)
Footballers from North Rhine-Westphalia
German footballers
Association football midfielders
VfL Bochum players
FC Schalke 04 II players
SV Lippstadt 08 players
VfL Osnabrück players
2. Bundesliga players
Regionalliga players